Kumbalam is a picturesque region in Kochi, in the state of Kerala, India. A water-bound countryside, bound by the Vembanad Lake, as well as the fast-encroaching city of Kochi, it is situated around 9 km from Vytilla Junction.

Location
Kumbalam is surrounded by Thevara in North, Wellington Island in North West, Edakochi in West, Kumbalangi in South West, Aroor in South, Panangad in Eastern side, Nettoor in North Eastern side.

References

Neighbourhoods in Kochi